Efteling is a fantasy-themed amusement park in Kaatsheuvel, the Netherlands. The attractions reflect elements from ancient myths and legends, fairy tales, fables, and folklore.

The park was opened on May 31, 1952. It evolved from a nature park with a playground and a Fairytale Forest into a full-sized theme park. It now caters to both children and adults with its cultural, romantic, and nostalgic themes, in addition to its wide array of amusement rides including six roller coasters and four dark rides.

It is the largest theme park in the Netherlands and one of the oldest theme parks in the world. It is twice as large as the original Disneyland park in the United States and predates it by three years. Annually, the park has more than 5 million visitors. In 2020, it was the most visited theme park in Europe, before Disneyland Park (Paris).

History 

Efteling is one of the oldest theme parks still in existence. Its roots go back to 1935, when the R. K. Sport en Wandelpark was inaugurated.

In 1950, Efteling Nature Park Foundation (Stichting Natuurpark de Efteling) was founded by the mayor of Loon op Zand, R.J. van der Heijden, filmmaker Peter Reijnders, and designer artist Anton Pieck (1895-1987). The foundation was named after a 16th-century farm named Ersteling.

Efteling officially opened on May 31, 1952, when the Fairy Tale Forest (het Sprookjesbos), designed by the famous Dutch illustrator Anton Pieck, was opened to the public. Initially, the Fairy Tale Forest was home to some 10 different fairy tales, all of them brought to life using original drawings by Pieck alongside mechanics, lighting and sound effects designed by the Dutch filmmaker Peter Reijnders. The life-sized dioramas, displayed together in an atmospheric forest, were a tremendous success. In 1952 alone, Efteling welcomed 240,000 visitors.

Since 1978, the park has been expanded and grown to become one of the most popular theme parks in the world. In the same year, English singer Kate Bush performed in the park in De Efteling Special, which was broadcast on 11 May 1978. In early 1978, the amusement park's Haunted Castle was completed and the opening was scheduled on 10 May that year. Bush, who just had a big hit in the Netherlands with "Wuthering Heights", made her debut on Dutch television in the special. Her popularity was used to draw the attention to the Haunted Castle.

The Dutch climate and the integral role of natural greenery in the park's appearance prevented the opening of the park year-round.

In 2010, Efteling announced plans to remain open year-round. From November through about February, the 'Winter Efteling' theme remains in place. However, attractions that involve water, such as the rapids ride 'Piraña' or the water coaster 'Vliegende Hollander' (Flying Dutchman), are closed.

Gisela Williams, a reporter for The Wall Street Journal, wrote a review of the park in early 2014. Williams praised Efteling but criticized the teacups-style ride Monsieur Cannibale due to ethnic stereotypes. Her review was later mentioned in De Telegraaf, a daily newspaper in the Netherlands, and drew several angry comments from its readership. Williams also received her first death threat for her comments about the controversial attraction. In recent years, activists have repeatedly requested the Efteling to remove or re-theme the attraction. In June 2021, the park closed the ride for an extensive renovation including a re-theme.

The park received its 123,456,789th guest on June 19, 2015.

The Efteling opened the trackless darkride Symbolica in 2017. With a price tag of 35 million euros, it is the most expensive investment in Efteling history. Beside the theme park, the Efteling operates two hotels, a theatre, a golf course, and two holiday villages.

The Efteling inaugurated its 30th fairytale in 2019.

In December 2020, the park was forced to close in compliance with the new COVID-19 restrictions introduced by prime minister Mark Rutte and the third Rutte cabinet.

Design 

The success of Efteling has been attributed largely to its ride designs, architecture and atmosphere. When Anton Pieck was asked to design the initial fairy tales for the Efteling, he made sure the park would live up to his personal high standards. There would be no use of cheap building materials, plastic, or concrete. Pieck's illustration style, somewhat grim and dark, but also romantic and nostalgic, was the thematic base on which nearly all future expansions were built.

Pieck worked for Efteling until the mid-1970s, when his position as chief designer was passed on to the younger Ton van de Ven. Van de Ven had already been working for Efteling for several years and Pieck was very pleased with his work. The Haunted Castle (het Spookslot), which opened in 1978 as the park's first new large attraction, was Efteling's first to be designed entirely by Van de Ven.

Van de Ven continued his work until 2002, when he retired. A new team of imagineers works on new Efteling attractions, still in a style suitable to the Efteling.

Divisions 
The Efteling Theme Park Resort now comprises several divisions: the theme park (1952), the four-star Efteling Hotel (1992), the 18-hole golf course (1995), Efteling Theatre (2002), accommodation parks: Efteling Bosrijk (2009) & Het Loonsche Land (2017). The theatre, which was once used for park shows, is one of the five biggest theatres in the Netherlands and can house big theatre productions, which will not be included in park admissions.

Besides using it as a home base for shows/musicals created by the Efteling itself (like "Droomvlucht") it also lends itself out for other big productions, events, and business events. The hotel was operated by Golden Tulip for several years, but Efteling decided in 2004 to manage it independently. All divisions are now profitable, although it took the golf course several years to break even. The divisions are each contained in commercial corporations, but all shares are still held by the nonprofit Efteling Nature Park Foundation (Stichting Natuurpark de Efteling).

The park 

This area has changed only marginally over the course of its history. The park's foundation owns a total of  also including young forest, nature reserve, some grassland, fields and roads.

The park is divided into five themed areas or 'realms'. Originally, the park was divided into four areas called North, West, East, and South, with most of the park's historical rides and attractions, such as the Fairy Tale Forest, located in West. When the park reorganized its infrastructure in the late 1990s, adding the Pardoes Promenade (named after Efteling's mascot Pardoes, a court jester) and a central hub called Efteling Brink, it also changed the areas' names. North was changed to Reizenrijk (Travel Realm), West became Marerijk (Fairy Realm), East became Ruigrijk (Adventure Realm), and South became Anderrijk (Other Realm). In 2017 a fifth realm opened in the center of the park called Fantasierijk (Fantasy Realm).

Although the park was not built with these divisions in mind and the names may seem cryptic, they do make sense. Perhaps the area most suited to its name is Ruigrijk, where most fast rides such as the double-loop roller coaster Python (constructed in 1981) are located. Marerijk is the home to the Fairy Tale Forest and the Fairies of the Droomvlucht, Anderrijk has some rides that are inspired by non-Western cultures (e.g. Fata Morgana and Piraña), while Reizenrijk has the Carnaval Festival ride, which travels through several different 'countries'. The Fantasierijk got its name from the darkride Symbolica: Palace of Fantasy.

Efteling was largely built in an existing pine forest located in a rural area, giving it a 'nature park' feeling. Together with its large ponds and gardens, its abundant green space is rather unusual among the world's leading theme parks.

Attractions and rides in Efteling and their designers 

1952 - Fairytale Forest (Dutch: Sprookjesbos; Anton Pieck, Peter Reijnders, Ton van de Ven, Henny Knoet, Michel den Dulk, Karel Willemen and Pim-Martijn Sanders)
1954 - Children's Railway (Dutch: Kinderspoor), (pedal trains, Anton Pieck and Peter Reijnders)
1954 - Anton Pieck Square (Dutch: Anton Pieckplein), (square with nostalgic rides, Anton Pieck and Michel den Dulk) 
1956 - Stoomcarrousel (carousel, bought from L. Janvier)
1969 - Stoomtrein (a  narrow-gauge heritage railway)
1971 - Diorama (Model railway/ Diorama, Anton Pieck)
1981 - Python (double loop corkscrew roller coaster, Vekoma) (original demolished in 2018, replaced by a replica 3 months later) 
1981 - Gondoletta (tow boat ride, Ton van de Ven)
1982 - Half Moon (Dutch: Halve Maen) (ship swing, Ton van de Ven)
1983 - Piraña (river rafting ride, Ton van de Ven) 
1984 - Carnival Festival (dark ride, Geesink)
1984 - Tin Lizzies (Dutch: De Oude Tuffer) (car ride, Ton van de Ven)
1986 - Fata Morgana (dark, tow boat ride, Ton van de Ven)
1987 - Pagode (observation tower, Ton van de Ven)
1990 - The People of Laaf (Dutch: Volk van Laaf) (Ton van de Ven)
1993 - Dreamflight (Dutch: Droomvlucht) (dark ride, Ton van de Ven)
1996 - The House of the Five Senses (Dutch: Het huis van de 5 zintuigen) (park entrance, Ton van de Ven)
1996 - Villa Volta (madhouse, Ton van de Ven)
1998 - Bird Rok (Dutch: Vogel Rok) (enclosed roller coaster, Ton van de Ven)
2007 - The Flying Dutchman (Dutch: De Vliegende Hollander) (water coaster / dark ride, Karel Willemen) 
2010 - George and the Dragon (Dutch: Joris en de Draak) (wooden racing coaster, Karel Willemen)
2011 - Ravelin (Dutch: Raveleijn) (theatre, Sander de Bruijn)
2012 - Aquanura (Musical Fountain, WET) 
2015 - Baron 1898 (dive coaster Bolliger & Mabillard, Sander de Bruijn) 
2017 - Symbolica (dark ride, ETF Ride Systems/Sander de Bruijn and others)
2019 - Fabula replaces the former PandaVision (€3.5 million renovation by Efteling and Aardman Animations)
2020 - Max & Moritz (double roller coaster, Mack Rides), Robbert Jaap Janssen 
2024 - Danse Macabre, Jeroen Verheij

Former attractions:

1953 - 2011 Rowing Pond (Dutch: Roeivijver), replaced by Aquanura
1953 - 1988 Swimming Pool (Dutch: Zwembad)
1966 - 2010 Water Organ (Dutch: Waterorgel), in use as a TV studio since 2010
1978 - 2022 Haunted Castle (Dutch: Spookslot) (haunted attraction, Ton van de Ven and Anton Pieck), closed 2022, will be replaced by Danse Macabre in 2024.
1984 - 2020 Polka Marina (a combination of a carousel and a minirollercoaster, Ton van de Ven)
1985 - 2019 Bob Track (Dutch: Bobbaan) (bobsled roller coaster, Intamin Ton van de Ven), demolished in 2019, replaced by Max & Moritz
1988 - 2021 Monsieur Cannibale (teacups ride, Henny Knoet) Replaced by Sirocco
1991 - 2009 Pegasus (junior wooden roller coaster, demolished in 2009), replaced by George and the Dragon
2002 - 2019 PandaVision (Dutch: Pandadroom) (a 4-D film cinema, Van Doorn and associates), replaced by Fabula

Other ventures operating independently from the amusement park:

1992 - Tower Realm (Dutch: Torenrijk) (theme hotel)
1995 - Efteling Golf course (Dutch: Golfclub Efteling) (golf course)
2002 - Efteling Theatre (theatre, Ton van de Ven)
2008 - Efteling Radio (radio station)
2009 - Forest Realm (Dutch: Bosrijk) (accommodation area, Karel Willemen)
2017 - The Loonsche Land (Dutch: Het Loonsche Land) (accommodation)

Awards 
 In 1971, the Efteling was the first theme park to receive the Pomme d'Or (Golden Apple), in recognition of superior efforts in promoting and raising Europe's level of tourism. The Pomme d'Or is the highest award in the European tourist industry.
In 1992, the Efteling was awarded the IAAPA Applause Award for best theme park in the world.
In 1997, Villa Volta, as the first 'new style' madhouse in the world, received the Thea Attraction Award.
In 2005, the Efteling received the Thea Classic Award for the year 2004, a notable token of recognition of quality awarded by other people in the themed entertainment industry. Efteling is the second park to receive a prize for their entire oeuvre, the first being Tivoli Gardens in Copenhagen, Denmark.
In 2014, 2015 and 2016, the Efteling won the award for the best holiday park in the Netherlands according to the booking sites BungalowSpecials.nl, BungalowSpecials.be, FerienparkSpecials.de and HolidayParkSpecials.co.uk. These awards were based solely on ratings from guests who have stayed at the Efteling.
In 2017, the Efteling was titled 'Best Themepark' in the world by Theme Park Insider, based on overall reader and visitor ratings.
In 2018, Symbolica received the TEA Award For Outstanding Achievement.
In 2018, 'Best Themepark' and 'Best new dark ride' in the world by Theme Park Insider.
In 2019, 'Best Themepark' in The Netherlands & Belgium. Diamond Theme Park Awards 2019.

Economy and governance

Structure 
The Efteling is a private company limited by shares. The Efteling Nature Park Foundation (Stichting Natuurpark de Efteling) is the only shareholder. The foundation was founded in 1950 by R.J.Th. van der Heijden, Peter Reijnders, and Anton Pieck. The company is led by two directors. They manage four sections: the theme park, the Efteling Hotel, the Efteling Golf course, and the Efteling Theatre.

Since April 17, 2014, the company's CEO has been Fons Jurgens.

Employees 
In the high season, Efteling employs 2,500 workers. In 2000, the number was 1670, of which 400 had a permanent contract (24%), 450 were seasonal employees (27%) and 820 had temp jobs (49%).

Visitors 

 Disneyland Paris, #2 amusement park in Europe of annual attendance
 Efteling, #1 amusement park in Europe of annual attendance

Efteling welcomed 3,240,000 visitors in 2007, making it the most popular theme park in the Netherlands. In 2009, the park's attendance surpassed for the first time since its opening 4,000,000 visitors and in 2017 roughly 5,180,000 visitors went to the park, making it the most popular tourist daytrip destination in all categories. The objective was to reach 5 million admissions in 2020. It is reached in 2017, three years earlier than expected.

In its opening year (1952), the park had 222,941 visitors. In 1954, the millionth visitor since the official opening was welcomed.

In 1983, the attendance increases by 30%. Efteling is the leading leisure park in Europe with 1.9 million visitors per year. In 1989, Efteling leads European parks in terms of attendance, 2.1 million people go to the park, including 1.6 million from the Netherlands. In 1991, Efteling is on the top step of the European podium with 2.6 million visitors. On the second step, three parks have 2 million admissions: Europa-Park, Alton Towers and Phantasialand. On the third step, two parks show 1.4 million admissions: Walibi Wavre and Parc Astérix.

Most of the visitors are Dutch; 94% of the Dutch population has visited the park. About 16% of visitors live in areas such as Flanders (Belgium), Westphalia (Germany) and Southern England (UK).

A graph of the number of visitors of the Efteling during the period 1952–2018:

Ticket price 
A graph of the ticket price in euros of the Efteling during the period 1952-2014:

From 1952 to 2002, the ticket price was set in Dutch guilders. These prices were converted to euros using a conversion factor of 0.45378. In 1952, the ticket price was 0.80 Dutch guilders (0.36 euro). From 1956 to 1965, the ticket price was 1 Dutch guilder. The price had risen to 42 Dutch guilders by 2001 and was converted to 21 euros in 2002, during the switch to the euro in the Netherlands.  tickets cost 42.00 euros or 40.00 euros by "low season". There are also  tickets for 68.00 euros that include lunch, dinner and free parking among other things. Tickets ordered online are sold with a discount of 2 euros. Admission is free for children under 4.

Investments 
On December 11, 2008, theme park officials announced that they would spend EUR40 million during 2009–2012 on three large construction projects: a convention centre accommodating 1500 visitors (de Burcht), an arena from the Middle Ages for 750 show spectators (Raveleijn), and a redesign for snack bar "De Likkebaerd" to turn it into a station for the park's steam train. They also said they did not expect to suffer from the Financial crisis of 2007–2008. In 2009, the Efteling announced that the Burcht has been cancelled.

The park announced in 2015 that they had the ambition to welcome 7 million guests by 2030. For this they drew up a zoning plan in the period from 2015 to 2018 called 'Bestemmingsplan Wereld van de Efteling 2030'. The park will at first expand to the east as far as the road De Horst and the highway N261. After the eastern expansion, the park will expand in a western direction on the site where parking spaces are currently located. In 2018, the zoning plan was unanimously adopted within the municipality of Loon op Zand, after which three objections were submitted to the Raad van State. Two objections were investigated by the council and in the meantime the council decided that De Efteling was not allowed to start implementing the plan. With an adjustment on a number of points, the council approved the zoning plan in June 2021. Due to the outbreak of the COVID-19 pandemic that led to the multiple closures of the park, the park had to review its investments. It decided to postpone the expansion towards the east side for a few years and to focus on expansions within the existing park boundaries. On January 24, 2022, the company announced that it would invest €75 million in the construction of a new hotel within the park on the square behind the entrance and in an attraction that will replace Spookslot.

Rumors of The Walt Disney Company's connection to the Efteling 
Efteling has a good relationship with The Walt Disney Company's theme parks. Disneyland Paris consulted Efteling during its construction and design phase, to adapt the American park to European tastes. As a token of appreciation, the Disney Company gave Efteling a small statue. Ton van de Ven, who designed many of Efteling's attractions, was also a good friend of Tony Baxter (senior vice president of Walt Disney Imagineering). The relationship between the two parks was emphasized when Efteling won the 2004 Thea Classic Award, the highest honor awarded by the Themed Entertainment Association: Efteling had, as it turned out, been nominated by Tony Baxter.

Also, a popular legend further links Disney and Efteling. For years, rumors have circulated that Walt Disney derived his inspiration for Disneyland (which opened in 1955), from Efteling (which opened in 1952). According to the legend, in the early 1950s, Walt Disney traveled to Europe a few times and visited several tourist attractions. Reportedly, a brochure from the International Association of Amusement Parks and Attractions even states that Disney "spent a great deal of time studying Pieck's work at Efteling before beginning his own park". However, the rumor was later discredited by Efteling. An off-hand remark by a PR person for Efteling during a presentation for a group of reporters further extend the legend's longevity. Walt Disney likely never actually visited Efteling, though he did visit Madurodam and Tivoli Gardens in Copenhagen. The latter actually did provide some inspiration for Disneyland.

Gallery

References

External links 

 

Efteling
1952 establishments in the Netherlands
Amusement parks in the Netherlands
Buildings and structures in North Brabant
Tourist attractions in North Brabant
Loon op Zand
Amusement parks opened in 1952
20th-century architecture in the Netherlands